Ivanhoe is a census-designated place (CDP) in southern Wythe County, Virginia, United States, that straddles the border of Wythe and Carroll counties. The population as of the 2010 Census was 551.  Ivanhoe is situated in the Appalachian Mountains along New River, and New River Trail State Park passes through Ivanhoe.

Demographics
According to the 2010 census, the CDP had a total population of 551, of whom 97.10% were White, 1.45% were American Indian or Alaska Native, 0.91 were some other race, 0.18% were two or more races. Of these, 1.45% were Hispanic or Latino of any race.

History 
Ivanhoe was the birthplace of Robert Sayers Sheffey, eccentric Methodist circuit rider and evangelist.

A nearby rock quarry and mines were no longer operating in 2018.

References

Census-designated places in Wythe County, Virginia
Unincorporated communities in Virginia
Census-designated places in Virginia